Serhiy Volodymyrovych Bilozor (born 15 July 1979 in Sumy) is a Ukrainian retired professional football defender.

Career

Metalurh Donetsk
On 20 September 2008 he played with FC Metalurh Donetsk in his 200th official match in the Ukrainian Premier League.

External links
Bio on Official Metalurh Donetsk website
Stats on Odessa Football website

References 

1979 births
Living people
Ukrainian footballers
FC Metalurh Donetsk players
Sportspeople from Sumy
FC Chornomorets Odesa players
FC Arsenal Kyiv players
FC Dnister Ovidiopol players
Ukrainian Premier League players
Association football defenders